Jim Mitchell (19 October 1946 – 2 December 2002) was an Irish Fine Gael politician who served as Deputy Leader of Fine Gael from 2001 to 2002, Minister for Communications from 1984 to 1987, Minister for Transport and Minister for Posts and Telegraphs from 1982 to 1984, Minister for Justice from 1981 to 1982 and Lord Mayor of Dublin from 1976 to 1977. He served as a Teachta Dála (TD) from 1977 to 2002.

Early life
Mitchell began his political involvement when he supported Seán MacBride, leader of the radical republican Clann na Poblachta at the 1957 general election. He joined Fine Gael in 1967, becoming that party's unsuccessful candidate in a by-election in 1970. He was an unsuccessful candidate for Dáil Éireann at the 1973 general election in Dublin South-West and lost again in the 1976 by-election in the same constituency, to Labour Party's Brendan Halligan. Mitchell was elected to Dublin Corporation in 1974. In 1976, aged 29, he became the youngest ever Lord Mayor of Dublin.

Outside politics he worked for Guinness at the St James's Gate Brewery.

Political career
At the 1977 general election he was elected to Dáil Éireann as a Fine Gael TD for the Dublin Ballyfermot constituency. With the party's loss of power in 1977, the new leader, Garret FitzGerald appointed Mitchell to the Party's Front Bench as Spokesperson for Labour. At the 1981 general election, Mitchell was elected for the Dublin West constituency and Fine Gael dramatically increased its number of seats and formed a coalition government with the Labour Party. On his appointment as Taoiseach, Garret FitzGerald caused some surprise by excluding some of the older conservative former ministers from his cabinet. Instead young liberals were appointed, with Mitchell receiving the post of Minister for Justice. The Fine Gael–Labour government collapsed in January 1982, but regained power in December of that year. Mitchell again was included in the FitzGerald cabinet, as Minister for Posts and Telegraphs and Minister for Transport. These positions were combined into the position of Minister of Communications in January 1984.

Mitchell granted the aviation licence to the fledgling airline Ryanair on 29 November 1985. This was granted despite strong opposition by Ireland's national carrier Aer Lingus, and from Fianna Fáil and other left-wing parties. The issue of the licence broke Aer Lingus' stranglehold on flights to London from the Republic of Ireland.

Mitchell, who was seen as being on the liberal wing of Fine Gael and was, however, out of favour with John Bruton when he became Fine Gael leader in 1990. When Bruton formed the Rainbow Coalition in December 1994, Mitchell was not appointed to any cabinet post.

Mitchell contested and won Dáil elections in 1977, 1981, February 1982, November 1982, 1987, 1989, 1992 and 1997. He also ran unsuccessfully for the European Parliament in the 1994 and 1999 elections. He also was director of elections for Austin Currie, the Fine Gael candidate, in the 1990 presidential election. In 2001, Bruton was deposed as Fine Gael leader, and replaced by Michael Noonan. Mitchell served as his deputy from 2001 to 2002.

Chairman of the Public Accounts Committee
Mitchell also chaired the Oireachtas Public Accounts Committee. Under Mitchell's chairmanship the committee began to look at allegations of corruption and wide-scale tax evasion in the banking sector, particularly regarding Deposit interest retention tax (DIRT). It was established that there was a culture of encouraging tax evasion within Irish banks, which had allowed wealthy customers to set up non-resident (off-shore, international) bank accounts into which money was transferred, enabling the account holder to avoid paying DIRT. The scandal resulted Allied Irish Banks being forced to reach a settlement of €90 million with the Revenue Commissioners in respect of DIRT evasion in 2000 in addition to thousands of tax-evaders being prosecuted including the former Minister for Justice Pádraig Flynn. The Mitchell inquiry was "shocked and horrified" at the "careless and reckless" manner in which the Governor of the Central Bank of Ireland had quoted false statistics to the Public Accounts subcommittee. Mitchell received much praise for his role in exposing the scandal.

Loss of seat and death
Though regarded in politics as one of Fine Gael's "survivors", who held onto his seat amid major boundary changes, constituency changes and by attracting working class votes in a party whose appeal was primarily middle class, Mitchell lost his Dublin Central seat at the 2002 general election. That election witnessed a large scale collapse in the Fine Gael vote, with the party dropping from 54 to 31 seats in Dáil Éireann. Although Mitchell suffered from the swing against Fine Gael in Dublin, he was not aided by the fact that Inchicore, which was considered his base in the constituency had been moved to Dublin South-Central. Jim had chosen not to run in that constituency as his brother Gay was a sitting TD running for re-election for that constituency.

Mitchell had earlier had a liver transplant in an attempt to beat a rare form of cancer which had cost the lives of a number of his siblings. Though the operation was successful, the cancer returned, and Mitchell ultimately died of the disease in December 2002.

His former constituency colleague and rival, Bertie Ahern, described Jim Mitchell as having made an "outstanding contribution to Irish politics."

See also
Families in the Oireachtas

References

 

1946 births
2002 deaths
Alumni of Dublin Institute of Technology
Fine Gael TDs
Lord Mayors of Dublin
Members of the 21st Dáil
Members of the 22nd Dáil
Members of the 23rd Dáil
Members of the 24th Dáil
Members of the 25th Dáil
Members of the 26th Dáil
Members of the 27th Dáil
Members of the 28th Dáil
Ministers for Justice (Ireland)
Ministers for Transport (Ireland)
Deaths from cancer in the Republic of Ireland